Sabbo may refer to
Sabbo and Kuti, Israeli music duo
Álvaro Sabbo (born 1926), Portuguese equestrian competitor in the 1956 Summer Olympics and 1960 Summer Olympics
Augusto Sabbo (1887–1971), Portuguese football manager